Celsinotum is a genus of crustaceans in the family Chydoridae.

References 

Cladocera
Animals described in 1991